The Ulinae are a subfamily of hairy-eyed craneflies closely related to true crane flies. There are about 28 species worldwide.

Genera
Ula Haliday, 1833

References

 

Pediciidae
Nematocera subfamilies